Kim Yoon-jin (born May 14, 1996), known professionally as Mirani, is a South Korean rapper and songwriter. She first garnered attention when she appeared on the rap competition TV show Show Me the Money 9 in 2020. She released the single "VVS" with rappers Munchman, Khundi Panda, and Mushvenom on the show which peaked at number 1 on the Gaon Digital Chart and won Hip-hop Track of the Year at the Korean Hip-hop Awards.

She signed to hip hop label Area in 2021 where she released the extended play Uptown Girl (2021).

Early life and education 
Kim Yoon-jin was born on May 14, 1996. She graduated from Ewha Womans University with a bachelor's degree in fashion industry.

She adopted the stage name "Mirani" from the character Mori Ran (known as Yoo Miran in South Korea) from the Japanese manga Case Closed.

Career

2020: "VVS" 
In April 2020, Mirani released her debut single "The Detective". 

In October 2020, she appeared on the rap competition TV show Show Me the Money 9 where she released the single "VVS" with rappers Munchman, Khundi Panda, and Mushvenom. It became her most successful single, ranking at number 1 on the Gaon Digital Chart for seven consecutive weeks and winning Hip-Hop Track of the Year at the Korean Hip-hop Awards. She also released singles "Achoo" and "Part Time" on the show and finished in the Top 8.

2021: Uptown Girl 
In March 2021, Mirani signed with Area, a hip hop label found by the record producer duo GroovyRoom. In November, she released the extended play Uptown Girl under the label.

Discography

Extended plays

Singles

Filmography

TV

Awards and nominations

Notes

References 
1996 births
Ewha Womans University alumni
Living people
Show Me the Money (South Korean TV series) contestants
South Korean women rappers

External links